Thanakorn Kamkhoma (born 12 July 1982), simply known as Jok, is a Thai former professional footballer.

Club career
He was one of the Chainat Hornbill legend because he played with Chainat Hornbill from 2010 to 2013 and the second time in 2014 to 2017 total 8 years so that he had nickname "prince of hornbills".

References

External links
 Profile at Goal

1982 births
Living people
Thanakorn Kamkhoma
Association football defenders
Thanakorn Kamkhoma
Thanakorn Kamkhoma
Thanakorn Kamkhoma
Thanakorn Kamkhoma